Events from the year 2002 in Nepal.

Incumbents
Monarch : King Gyanendra
Prime Minister: Sher Bahadur Deuba (until 4 October), Lokendra Bahadur Chand (starting 11 October)
Chief Justice: Keshav Prasad Upadhyaya (until 5 December), Kedar Nath Upadhyaya (starting 5 December)

Events 
 January 18 - US Secretary of State Colin Powell arrives in Nepal supporting the government efforts against fighting Maoist terrorist.
 February 15 - Members of the breakaway faction of CPN-UML rejoins the party, while some under the leadership of CP Mainali forms Communist Party of Nepal (Marxist–Leninist) declining to rejoin.
 February 27 - Maoists launch simultaneous attacks in Mangalsen and Sanfebagar of Accham District killing 141 including the Chief District Officer.
 May 22 - King Gyanendra dissolves parliament on recommendation of Prime Minister Sher Bahadur Deuba and calls for election on November 13.
 May 27
 State of emergency is extended for three months through royal ordinance.
 Maoists attack a Royal Nepal Army base in Khara, Rukum. A dozen soldiers are killed whereas over 100 maoists are killed in the attack.
 October 3 - Deuba proposes to delay election for a year.
 October 4 - King Gyanendra dismisses Prime Minister Sher Bahadur Deuba terming him incapable.
 November 14 - Maoists attack Khalanga, the district headquarter of Jumla.

Births

 July 10 – Prince Hridayendra of Nepal

Deaths
 October 15 - Lain Singh Bangdel, artist and novelist

References

 
Years of the 21st century in Nepal
Nepal
2000s in Nepal
Nepal